Tjapaltjarri is an Australian Aboriginal name and may be:

 Billy Stockman Tjapaltjarri (c.1927–2015), artist
 Cassidy Possum Tjapaltjarri (1923–2006), tribal elder and artist
 Clifford Possum Tjapaltjarri (1932–2002), painter
 Mick Namarari Tjapaltjarri (c.1926–1998), painter
 Thomas Tjapaltjarri (born c.1970), artist 
 Walala Tjapaltjarri (born c.1964), artist
 Warlimpirrnga Tjapaltjarri (born late 1950s), artist

See also
 Tjapaltjarri Brothers

Australian Aboriginal peoples